The men's 50 metre rifle three positions rifle shooting event at the 1960 Olympic Games took place on 7–8 September 1960 with 75 shooters from 41 nations competing. The three positions consist of; prone position, kneeling position and standing position.

Results

All shooters scoring 530 points are better, of the two qualifying groups, qualify for the final round.

Qualifying round

Group one

Group two

A total of 120 shots are taken 40 from each position, for a total of 400 points at each position.  With the possibility of 1,200 overall points.

Final

Key: =WR = equalled world record

References

Shooting at the 1960 Summer Olympics
Men's 050m 3 positions 1960